Aglossosia chrysargyria is a moth of the  subfamily Arctiinae. It is found in the Republic of Congo, the Democratic Republic of Congo, Kenya, Malawi, Sudan, Tanzania, Uganda, Zambia and Zimbabwe.

References

Moths described in 1900
Lithosiini
Moths of Africa